The 1972 South African Grand Prix, formally the Sixth AA Grand Prix of South Africa (Afrikaans: Sesde AA Suid-Afrikaanse Grand Prix), was a Formula One motor race held at Kyalami on 4 March 1972. It was race 2 of 12 in both the 1972 World Championship of Drivers and the 1972 International Cup for Formula One Manufacturers. The 79-lap race was won by McLaren driver Denny Hulme after he started from fifth position. Emerson Fittipaldi finished second for the Lotus team and McLaren driver Peter Revson came in third.

Report

Entry

A total of 27 cars were entered for this race. Although there was more than a month between the Argentine Grand Prix and South Africa, most cars were transported direct to Kyalami from Buenos Aires. There were few changes in the entry.

Having missed the trip to Argentina due to a clashing Formula 5000 race, Mike Hailwood returned to Team Surtees. Jean-Pierre Beltoise also missed Buenos Aires, due to legal problems following an accident that had claimed the life of Ignazio Giunti in January 1971. Team Williams ran a second March-Cosworth for rising star Carlos Pace alongside their regular driver, Henri Pescarolo. A new team arrived in South Africa, the Team Eifelland Caravans outfit making its first appearance with Rolf Stommelen down to drive. As usual for Kyalami, the field was bolstered by local entries: Dave Charlton in a Lucky Strike-sponsored Lotus 72D, and pair of cars from Team Gunston for John Love (Surtees TS9) and Willie Ferguson (Brabham BT33).

Qualifying

The reigning World Champion, and winner of the opening round, Jackie Stewart secured pole position, for Elf Team Tyrrell, averaging a speed of 119.221 mph. Stewart beat Clay Regazzoni (Ferrari) and Emerson Fittipaldi (Lotus) by a few tenth of a second. Mike Hailwood was next up on the second row, joined by Denny Hulme in his McLaren M19A. A pair of Ferrari 312B2 were on row three, with Mario Andretti ahead of Jacky Ickx. They were joined by François Cevert in the second Tyrrell.

Race

The race was held over 79 laps of the Kyalami circuit. At the start, Denny Hulme briefly held the lead before Jackie Stewart moved ahead, meanwhile Clay Regazzoni had a bad get away and was back in the midfield. The Tyrrell 003 of Stewart quickly built a lead while the battle for second between Hulme, Emerson Fittipaldi and Mike Hailwood detached itself from the rest of the field. The Yardley Team McLaren of Hulme began to overheat and this saw him dropped behind his rivals. Hailwood, a few laps later, was able to pass Fittipaldi to move up to second and began to challenge Stewart for the lead. On lap 28, the rear suspension of Hailwood's Surtees TS9B failed and he retired from the race. Although this left Fittipaldi to attack Stewart, the Tyrrell driver stayed ahead, only to suffer a gearbox failure on lap 45. Fittipaldi inherited the lead, with Hulme right on his tail. The Brazilian now ran into handling problems and this enable Hulme to regain the lead on lap 57, from which he would go to win. Fittipaldi was still in a strong second place as the gap between him and the third place, Chris Amon was large. The gap became even bigger where Amon's Matra MS120C developed a serious vibration. This saw him drop down the order and finish 3 laps adrift in 15th. Third place thus went to the second McLaren, of Peter Revson.

Hulme won in a time of 1hr 45.49.1mins., averaging a speed of 114.898 mph, and was over 14 seconds ahead of Fititpaldi. Revson was a further 12.7 seconds behind. Only other drivers to complete the full race distance were Mario Andretti (Ferrari) and Ronnie Peterson (March). This victory gave Hulme a six-point the lead in the World Championship.

Classification

Qualifying

Race

Championship standings after the race

Drivers' Championship standings

Constructors' Championship standings

Note: Only the top five positions are included for both sets of standings.

References

South African Grand Prix
Grand Prix
South African Grand Prix
March 1972 sports events in Africa